Boronia ericifolia, commonly known as Wongan Hills boronia, is a plant in the citrus family, Rutaceae and is endemic to the south-west of Western Australia. It is an erect, densely branched shrub with trifoliate leaves and pink, white or creamy yellow flowers with four petals and eight stamens only known from near Wongan Hills and Moora.

Description
There are eight stamens. Flowering occurs mainly from June to October and the fruit, a glabrous capsule, matures between August and October.

Taxonomy and naming
Boronia ericifolia was first formally described in 1863 by George Bentham from a specimen collected by James Drummond and the description was published in Flora Australiensis. The specific epithet (ericifolia) is derived from the Latin words erica meaning "heath" or "heather" and folium meaning "leaf".

Distribution and habitat
Wongan Hills boronia grows in woodland and heath in the Wongan Hills and Moora areas.

Conservation
Boronia ericifolia is classified as "Priority Two" by the Western Australian Government Department of Parks and Wildlife meaning that it is poorly known and from only one or a few locations.

References

ericifolia
Flora of Western Australia
Plants described in 1863
Taxa named by George Bentham